Barbara Bush (born 6 April 1964) is a Canadian diver and the Executive Director of the Alberta Diving Association. Bush was a finalist in the women's 3 metre springboard event at the 1988 Summer Olympics. She was also a silver medalist at the 1990 Commonwealth Games in Auckland, New Zealand.

Bush is the current Executive Director of the Alberta Diving Association and a currently ranked FINA International Diving Judge.

References

External links
 

1964 births
Living people
Canadian female divers
Olympic divers of Canada
Divers at the 1988 Summer Olympics
Divers from Montreal
Commonwealth Games medallists in diving
Commonwealth Games silver medallists for Canada
Divers at the 1990 Commonwealth Games
20th-century Canadian women
Medallists at the 1990 Commonwealth Games